Dora (Dhora) is a village in the Limassol District of Cyprus, located 6 km southwest of Malia. Built at an elevation of more than 600 meters, Dora "emerges" between two rivers, Ha and Dirizo. From the above, they predate the particular settlement before the consecutive blows of the Turks, the current village stretches at the foot of Mount Kordylas, said to resemble the hat worn by the ancient Carian, and perhaps synifasmenos to who were the first inhabitants of Dora, the Dorians who came to Cyprus through Caria of Asia Minor.

Elevation 
Dora is located 616 m above sea level. The Rok Dorá mountain located in the village has an elevation of 730 m.

References

Communities in Limassol District